Dead People may refer to:

 Dead body
 Death
 Ghost
 :Category:Dead people

Arts, entertainment, and media
"Dead People", song by 21 Savage from Issa Album 2017
 Messiah of Evil, a 1973 film, also released as Dead People